Louis Schlaefli (4 December 1938, Neuf-Brisach) is a Franco-Swiss scholar, collector, and librarian. Since 1964 he has been the librarian of the Sainte-Marie-Majeure Seminary in Strasbourg, for which he composed several major catalogs. He is also the author of more than five hundred articles and contributions related to the heritage and history of Alsace, mostly religious ones.

Selected publications 
Detailed references of about 300 of these 500 publications by Louis Schlaefli are included in the online catalog of the National and University Library in Strasbourg.
 Les Publications de la Grande congrégation académique de Molsheim, in Marian Library Studies, 1975, vol. 7, 
 La plus ancienne image pieuse du Schauenberg, in Marian Library Studies (University of Dayton), 1977, vol. 9, 5 pl.
 L'Alsace et les Chartreux, 1988, 
 Les bouteilles de la Passion, in Almanach Sainte-Odile, 1988, 
 Petites images de piété alsaciennes, 1989, 107 p. (in collaboration with François Lotz)
 , 1589-1697, Huber, 1993, 160 p.
  Katalog der Bücher aus der ehemalingen Bibliothek des Johannes Pistorius Niddanus d.J. (1546-1608) : die im Grand Séminaire zu Strasbourg zu finden sind : Bestand : 150 Titel zwischen 1490-1600 ediert, Emmendingen, 1994 (in collaboration with Hans-Juergen Guenther)
  Katalog der Bücher aus der ehemaligen Bibliothek der Pfarrherren Martin+Hieremias+Lazarus Rapp aus Offenburg die im Grand Séminaire zu Strasbourg zu finden sind : Bestand : 462 Titel zwischen 1481 und 1609 ediert, Emmendingen, 1995 (in collaboration with Hans-Juergen Guenther)
 Chartreux de Molsheim et chartreux alsaciens (XVIIIe-XXe), in Annuaire de la société d'histoire et d'archéologie de Molsheim et environs, 1995, 
 Catalogue des livres du seizième siècle (1531-1599) de la bibliothèque du Grand séminaire de Strasbourg, Valentin Koerner, Baden-Baden, 1995, 676 p.
 Supplément au catalogue des incunables et livres du XVIe (jusqu'en 1530) de la Bibliothèque du Grand Séminaire de Strasbourg, 1995, tiré à part des Archives de l'Église d'Alsace, 51, 1993–1994, 
 À propos des mouches espagnoles ou une affaire de sorcellerie à la Wantzenau au XVIIe siècle, in Annuaire de la Société des Amis du Vieux Strasbourg, n° 25, 1996-1997
 Molsheim, Alsace-France, Edira, 1996, 48 p. (in collaboration with Paul Kestler and Grégory Oswald)
 Un cas de sorcellerie de Niederentzen (1618), in Annuaire de la société d'histoire de la Hardt et du Ried, 1996, n° 9, 
 Meuniers et moulins de Dinsheim sous l'Ancien Régime, in Annuaire de la société d'histoire et d'archéologie de Molsheim et environs, 1996, 
 Kanonikus Alexandre Straub auf Studienreise in Baden, in Die Ortenau, n° 77, 1997, 
 Les aveux d'un sorcier de neuf ans originaire de Saverne, in Pays d'Alsace. Cahier de la Société d'histoire et d'archéologie de Saverne et environs, n° 182, 1998, 
 Inventaires de bibliothèques de curés d'Obernai et des environs (1579-1689), in Annuaire de la Société d'histoire et d'archéologie de Dambach-la-ville/Barr/Obernai, 32, 1998, 
 Le couvent des Pénitentes de Sainte-Madeleine à Strasbourg. Notes historiques et artistiques, leçons d'un obituaire, in Annuaire de la Société des Amis du Vieux Strasbourg, n° 26, 1998–1999, 
  Vier Pfarrbibliotheken des 16. Jahrhunderts aus Offenburg und der Ortenau, in Die Ortenau, n° 80, 2000, 
 Un document d'art populaire religieux : un manuscrit illustre de Bollwiller (1769-1770), in Cahiers alsaciens d'archéologie d'art et d'histoire, XLIII, 2000, 
  Der Pfarrklerus der Ortenau. Die drei rechtsrheinischen Ruralkapitel des ehemaligen Bistums Strassburg (14. bis 17. Jahrhundert). Eine Dokumentation, in Simpliciana XXV (2003),  and XXVII (2005), 
 Catalogue de la bibliothèque du couvent de la Divine Providence à Ribeauvillé : fonds anciens (XVe - XVIIe siècles), Valentin Koerner, Baden-Baden, 2002, 237 p.
 Guerres mondiales et images pieuses, in Cahiers Alsaciens d'archéologie, d'art et d'histoire, 50, 2007
 Particularités relatives aux procès de sorcellerie intentés aux enfants à Molsheim au XVIIe siècle, in Revue d’Alsace, n° 134, 2008, 
 Le , Éd. du Signe, 2011, 347 p.
 150 images de Saint-Étienne, Strasbourg, 2011, 64 p.

References

Bibliography 
 Jean-Marie Le Minor, « Louis Schlaefli », in Nouveau dictionnaire de biographie alsacienne, Fédération des sociétés d'histoire et d'archéologie d'Alsace, 2006, vol. 47, 
 Mélanges offerts à Louis Schlaefli, Société d'histoire et d'archéologie de Molsheim et environs, 2008, 160 p.

External links 
 Monsieur Louis Schlaefli. Prix d'honneur des amis du Vieux-Strasbourg 2000 (L'Écho, Collège Saint-Étienne)
 Louis Schlaefli : les imprimeurs strasbourgeois aux XVe et XVIe siècles
 La grâce d'une cathédrale
 Illustration 
 SCHLAEFLI (Louis), Le Collège épiscopal Saint-Etienne

1938 births
People from Haut-Rhin
French librarians
French palaeographers
French collectors
Living people